George Austin may refer to:
 George Austin (gardener) ( 1780), English gardener
 George Austin (priest) (1931–2019), English Anglican priest

See also
 George Austen (disambiguation)